Star Wars comics have been produced by various comic book publishers since the debut of the 1977 film Star Wars. Marvel Comics launched its original series in 1977, beginning with a six-issue comic adaptation of the film and running for 107 issues, including an adaptation of The Empire Strikes Back. Marvel also released an adaptation of Return of the Jedi and spin-offs based on Droids and Ewoks. A self-titled comic strip ran in American newspapers between 1979 and 1984. Blackthorne Publishing released a three-issue run of 3-D comics from 1987 to 1988.

Dark Horse Comics published the limited series Dark Empire in 1991, and ultimately produced over 100 Star Wars titles, including Tales of the Jedi (1993–1998), X-wing: Rogue Squadron (1995–1998), Republic (1998–2006), Tales (1999–2005), Empire (2002–2006), Knights of the Old Republic (2006–2010), and Legacy (2006–2010), as well as manga adaptations of the original film trilogy and the 1999 prequel The Phantom Menace.

The Walt Disney Company acquired Marvel in 2009 and Lucasfilm in 2012, and the Star Wars comics license returned to Marvel in 2015. Several new series were launched, including Star Wars, Star Wars: Darth Vader, and Doctor Aphra. In 2017, IDW Publishing launched the anthology series Star Wars Adventures. In 2022, Dark Horse resumed publishing new Star Wars comics and graphic novels.

Overview
The original series by Marvel Comics began in 1977 with a six-issue comic adaptation of the original film and ran for 107 issues and three Annuals until 1986, featuring stories set between the original trilogy films, as well as adaptations of The Empire Strikes Back and Return of the Jedi. From 1985 to 1987, Marvel published two short-lived series based on the Star Wars animated series Droids and Ewoks. Briefly, the publishing rights went to Blackthorne Publishing, which released a three-issue run of 3-D comics from 1987 to 1988. Then, three years later, the rights to publish Star Wars comics were acquired by Dark Horse Comics, who published the limited series Dark Empire in 1991 and ultimately produced over 100 Star Wars titles until 2014.

Following the October 2012 acquisition of Lucasfilm by The Walt Disney Company, in January 2014, it was announced that the Star Wars comics license would return to Marvel Comics in 2015 (Disney having previously purchased Marvel Entertainment and the Marvel Comics brand and publishing in 2009).
In April 2014, Lucasfilm rebranded the majority of the Star Wars Expanded Universe as Legends, only keeping the theatrical Skywalker saga and the 2008 Clone Wars theatrical film and television series as canon. Most media released since then is considered part of the same canon, including comics.

Timeline

Marvel (1977–1987)

Lucasfilm publicity supervisor Charles Lippincott approached publisher Stan Lee at Marvel Comics in 1975 about publishing a Star Wars comic book prior to the film's release. Lee initially declined to consider such a proposal until the film was completed, and was only persuaded otherwise in a second meeting arranged by Roy Thomas, who wanted to edit the series. Since movie tie-in comics rarely sold well at that time, Lee negotiated a publishing arrangement which gave no royalties to Lucasfilm until sales exceeded 100,000. Thomas and artist Howard Chaykin adapted the events of the original film in issues #1–6 of Star Wars, with the first issue released for sale on April 12, 1977. According to former Marvel editor-in-chief Jim Shooter, the strong sales of Star Wars comics saved Marvel financially in 1977 and 1978. The series began featuring original stories with issue #7 (January 1978). Writer Archie Goodwin and artist Carmine Infantino took over the series as of #11 (May 1978). The series was one of the industry's top selling titles in 1979 and 1980. The 100,000 copy sales quota was surpassed quickly, allowing Lippincott to renegotiate the royalty arrangements. A six-issue adaptation of The Empire Strikes Back by Goodwin and artists Al Williamson and Carlos Garzon appeared in issues #39–44 (September 1980 – February 1981). Writer David Michelinie and artist Walt Simonson became the new creative team with issue #51 (September 1981). Ron Frenz became the regular artist of the title starting with issue #71 (May 1983). As of 1984, the Star Wars series was primarily written by Jo Duffy, and art for the final year and a half of the series was by Cynthia Martin. Marvel published the series until 1986, lasting 107 issues and three Annuals.

The first original Star Wars stories not directly adapted from the films to appear in print form were Star Wars comics serialized in the Marvel magazine Pizzazz (1977–1979). The first story arc, titled "The Keeper's World", was by Thomas, Chaykin, and Tony DeZuniga. The second story arc, entitled "The Kingdom of Ice", was by Goodwin, Simonson, Klaus Janson, Dave Cockrum, and John Tartaglione. The final two chapters were scheduled to be printed in issues #17 and 18, but the magazine was cancelled after issue #16. Marvel UK reprinted "The Keeper's World" in its Star Wars Weekly #47–50, and "The Kingdom of Ice" (including the previously unreleased chapters) in its Star Wars Weekly #57–60 between 1978 and 1979.

Marvel's Star Wars comics were reprinted in the U.K. as a weekly black-and-white comics anthology. The weekly U.K. issues split the stories from the U.S. monthly issues into smaller installments, and it usually took two to three weekly issues to complete a U.S. monthly issue. The U.K. comic also published original Star Wars stories by British creators, including Alan Moore. Star Wars Weekly #1 was published with a free cut-out X-wing fighter on February 8, 1978. It became The Empire Strikes Back Weekly from issue #118 in May 1980, and then became a monthly title from issue #140 in November 1980, reverting to the title Star Wars with issue #159 in July 1982. The monthly comic ran until issue #171 in July 1983, when the numbering was reset at #1 for Return of the Jedi Weekly, which was the first time the U.K. comic had been printed in color. This is the title and format that remained until the last issue (#155) was published in June 1986. Further original content was published in issues #94–99, 104–115, 149 and 153–157. Throughout this eight-year period, Marvel UK also published several Star Wars Annuals and Specials.

Marvel's adaptation of Return of the Jedi (October 1983 – January 1984) appeared in a separate four-issue limited series as well as in Marvel Super Special #27 and in a mass market paperback. From 1985 to 1987, the animated children's series Ewoks and Droids inspired comic series from Marvel's Star Comics line.

Pendulum Press (1978)
In 1978, Pendulum Press, under their educational series Contemporary Motivators, also published a 31-page loose adaptation of Star Wars by Linda A. Cadrain and Charles Nicholas. Produced as part of a package which included an audio tape and a film strip, the comic was specifically designed for classroom use, with typeset instead of hand lettering, and vocabulary appropriate for children.

Newspaper strip (1979–1984)

A newspaper strip was published between 1979 and 1984, distributed by Los Angeles Times Syndicate and the Watertown Daily Times. The creative teams were revolving, but included Archie Goodwin, Williamson, Russ Manning, Steve Gerber, Alfredo Alcala, Carlos Garzon and letterer Ed King. Goodwin switched from writing Marvel's Star Wars series to the weekly newspaper comic strip after the release of The Empire Strikes Back (1980), becoming the first writer to draw from more than just the original film in establishing the era set between the two films. The strip was based on the storyline and characters established in the original trilogy, but never adapted any of the films, instead fleshing out the history between them. From October 1980 to February 1981, Goodwin and Alcala adapted Brian Daley's Han Solo at Stars' End (1979).

In 1991, Russ Cochran published a 2500-copy limited run of a three-volume hardcover boxset of all of Goodwin and Williamson's Star Wars comic strips from 1981 to 1984, signed by both creators, and featuring new cover illustrations by the latter. Dark Horse Comics collected colorized compilations of the newspaper strip in its Classic Star Wars series from 1992 to 1994. Between 2017 and 2018, The Library of American Comics published a three-volume reprint series of the complete comic strip.

Blackthorne (1987–1988)
Blackthorne Publishing released a three-issue series called Star Wars 3-D from December 1987 to February 1988. The comics were later reprinted in a black-and-white, non-3-D format by Dark Horse in their 2013 Star Wars Omnibus: Wild Space, Volume 1.

Dark Horse (1991–2014)
Adaptations
Film and television adaptations

Dark Horse also published miniseries adapting Episode I: The Phantom Menace, Episode II: Attack of the Clones, Episode III: Revenge of the Sith . From 1998 to 1999, Dark Horse produced Star Wars manga, adapting the original trilogy and The Phantom Menace as manga with all the typical narrative and stylistic characteristics of the form.

Legends novel adaptations

Between 1995 and 1998, Dark Horse published adaptations of the Thrawn trilogy of novels by Timothy Zahn.

Original series (Dark Horse comics)
Dark Horse subsequently launched dozens of series set after, in between, and before the original film trilogy, including Tales of the Jedi (1993–1998), X-wing: Rogue Squadron (1995–1998), Republic (1998–2006), the mostly non-canonical Tales (1999–2005), Empire (2002–2006), Knights of the Old Republic (2006–2010), and Legacy (2006–2010).

Dark Empire

In the late 1980s, writer Tom Veitch and artist Cam Kennedy secured a deal to produce a Star Wars comic for Archie Goodwin at Epic Comics, a Marvel imprint. After the project was announced, Goodwin left Marvel, which dropped the comic. Dark Horse Comics subsequently published it as the Dark Empire sequence (1991–1995).

Classic Star Wars
Classic Star Wars is a series of comics which included compilations of weekly installments of the newspaper comics written by Archie Goodwin with art by Al Williamson.

X-wing

Star Wars: X-wing – Rogue Squadron is a comic book series of 35 issues released between 1995 and 1998. It follows the titular squadron beginning about one year after the events of Return of the Jedi.

X-wing – Rogue Leader is a three-part comic book series set approximately one week after the end of Return of the Jedi. Several participants in the destruction of the second Death Star are sent, a little while after the events of Bakura, to scout out Imperial activity in Corellian space.

Shadows of the Empire

Crimson Empire

The Crimson Empire trilogy follows Kir Kanos, one of Palpatine's Imperial guards, beginning about seven years after the events of Return of the Jedi. Set shortly after Dark Empire, it relates that Imperial Guard Carnor Jax betrayed the cloned Palpatine and his guards in an attempt to consolidate his own power. Kanos swears to stop him, coming close to New Republic Intelligence agent Mirith Sinn in the process.

Crimson Empire II introduces Nom Anor, who served as the model for the Yuuzhan Vong in The New Jedi Order, which he also appears in.

Qui-Gon & Obi-Wan

Qui-Gon & Obi-Wan: Last Stand on Ord Mantell is a three-part comics series written by Ryder Windham, published by Dark Horse Comics between December 2000 and March 2001. The story features Qui-Gon Jinn and Obi-Wan Kenobi five years before Episode I – The Phantom Menace.

Qui-Gon & Obi-Wan: The Aurorient Express is a two-part comics series written by Mike Kennedy, and published by Dark Horse Comics between February 2002 and June 2002. The series is set in the Star Wars galaxy six years before The Phantom Menace. A luxury cloud cruiser has slipped out of control and is going to crash over Yorn Skot. The two Jedi must board the runaway ship and regain control.

Knights of the Old Republic and The Old Republic

Star Wars: Knights of the Old Republic and Star Wars: The Old Republic are series set around the events of the game series of the same name, exploring its backstory.

Legacy

Star Wars: The Clone Wars

Other original series (Dark Horse comics)

Star Wars: Agent of the Empire is a series set a few years before Episode IV – A New Hope, and focusing on an Imperial Intelligence agent named Jahan Cross. Trade paperbacks: Volume 1: Iron Eclipse (collects Star Wars: Agent of the Empire – Iron Eclipse #1–5, 128 pages, October 2012)
Star Wars: Invasion is a series set during the early days of the Yuuzhan Vong War, and dealing with how the New Republic is faring. The series, published by Dark Horse Comics, was written by Tom Taylor, and illustrated by Colin Wilson with color by Wes Dzioba. The first printed issue was published on July 1, 2009. Published by Dark Horse Comics, the series was set in the New Jedi Order era and depict the events of the Yuuzhan Vong War over 16 issues, plus a prologue issue. In January 2010, Star Wars: Invasion #0 was nominated for a 'Diamond Gem Award' in the '2009 Comic Book of the Year Over $3.00' category.
Star Wars: Dark Times, is a series set in the years after Episode III – Revenge of the Sith, and showing former characters from Star Wars: Republic after Order 66.
 Star Wars: Knight Errant, a series set 1,000 years before The Phantom Menace, and dealing with a lone Jedi's war against the Sith.
 Star Wars: Blood Ties, a series set in varying time periods that shows the bonds between certain characters in the saga, such as Jango Fett and Boba Fett.
 Star Wars: Darth Vader, a series set almost immediately after Revenge of the Sith, and showing how Darth Vader is dealing with his past as Anakin Skywalker.
 Star Wars: Dawn of the Jedi, a series set thousands of years before Episode I – The Phantom Menace, and showing the origins of the Jedi and the Sith.
 Star Wars is set shortly after A New Hope, focusing on the main characters of the original trilogy.

Limited series (Dark Horse comics)
After Knights of the Old Republic and Legacy ended in 2010, instead of publishing ongoing series, Dark Horse began publishing a "series of miniseries", including:

 Star Wars: Jedi, a series set a few decades before The Phantom Menace, and dealing with Qui-Gon Jinn in an undocumented area of his life.

One-shots (Dark Horse comics)Routine Valor is a comic book one-shot released on May 6, 2006 by Dark Horse Comics for Free Comic Book Day 2006 as part of a Star Wars-Conan flipbook. The story is set during the end of the Clone Wars, approximately one year before the events of Revenge of the Sith (and 20 years before the events of A New Hope). Characters include Obi-Wan Kenobi, along with Clone troopers Commander Cody, CT-8867, CT-8868, and CT-8869

External links:

Dark Horse Listing

Alternate storylines

While non-canonical to the Expanded Universe, Star Wars Infinities shows alternate storylines for the original trilogy films, and Visionaries featured stories by artists who worked on Revenge of the Sith.

The Star Wars is a 2013-2014 non-canonical comic series based on The Star Wars: Rough Draft, George Lucas's discarded 1974 draft for the original film. The series was written by J. W. Rinzler with art by Mike Mayhew. In this version, Luke Skywalker is more mature and a Jedi, and the main protagonist is named Annikin Starkiller. The series received mostly positive reviews.

Return to Marvel (2015–present)
Following the acquisition of Lucasfilm by The Walt Disney Company in 2012, it was announced in January 2014 that the Star Wars comics license would return to Marvel Comics in 2015. Disney had purchased Marvel's parent company, Marvel Entertainment, in 2009. Meanwhile, with the sequel film The Force Awakens in production, most of the licensed Star Wars novels and comics produced since the originating 1977 film Star Wars were rebranded as Star Wars Legends and declared non-canon to the franchise in April 2014.

Early reports in May 2014 suggested that Marvel would announce two new ongoing Star Wars comic series at the San Diego Comic-Con. In July 2014, Marvel announced three new series at SDCC: Star Wars, Star Wars: Darth Vader, and the limited series Star Wars: Princess Leia.

Ongoing series

The initial series, Star Wars, was released in January 2015, with Darth Vader debuting in February.

The ongoing series Star Wars: Poe Dameron was announced in January 2016. Featuring X-wing fighter pilot Poe Dameron introduced in The Force Awakens, the series debuted on April 6, 2016. A six-issue comic adaptation of The Force Awakens by Chuck Wendig began publication in June 2016. In 2017. A second volume of the Marvel Darth Vader comic, subtitled Dark Lord of the Sith, began in June 2017 from writer Charles Soule and artist Giuseppe Camuncoli.

In August 2019, Marvel announced that the main Star Wars series that started in 2015, which has narratively caught up to the timeframe of the events of The Empire Strikes Back, would end in November 2019 with issue #75. A 56-page one-shot called Star Wars: Empire Ascendant, written by Soule, Greg Pak, Simon Spurrier, and Ethan Sacks, was released in December 2019 to wrap up the series.

At New York Comic Con in October 2019, Lucasfilm and Marvel announced the main Star Wars title would relaunch with a new ongoing series beginning in January 2020. Written by Soule, the flagship series will explore the time between The Empire Strikes Back and Return of the Jedi. It will expand on stories like how the demoralized ragtag band of rebels grows into the massive fleet that attacks the second Death Star, how the plan to rescue Han Solo from Jabba the Hutt is formed, how Leia balances her personal desires to save Han with her responsibilities to the Rebellion, Luke's growth as a Jedi while coming to an understanding of Darth Vader's reveal of his heritage, and the evolution of Lando Calrissian from selfish betrayer to trusted general.

First announced as Project Luminous at Star Wars Celebration in April 2019, full details of a publishing initiative called Star Wars: The High Republic were revealed in a press conference in February 2020. Involving the majority of the current officially licensed publishers, a new era set 200 years before the Skywalker Saga will be explored in various books and comics, including an ongoing Marvel title written by Cavan Scott. 

The ongoing series Han Solo and Chewbacca was announced in December of 2021. The series was described as being a collection of different adventures of the pair, starting just a few years before the events of Star Wars: A New Hope.

Trade paperback collections

Star Wars (2015)

Star Wars (2020)

Darth Vader (2015)

Darth Vader: Dark Lord of the Sith

Darth Vader (2020)

Doctor Aphra

Doctor Aphra (2020)

Kanan

Poe Dameron

Star Wars: Bounty Hunters

Crossovers

Limited series and one-shots
Princess Leia released in March 2015. Chewbacca (October–December 2015), Obi-Wan & Anakin (January–May 2016), and Han Solo (June–November 2016), as well as the one-shots Vader Down (November 2015) and C-3PO (April 2016). Several other limited series followed, including Kanan (April 2015 – March 2016), Lando (July–October 2015), Shattered Empire (September–October 2015),

In 2017, limited series Darth Maul, Mace Windu, and Captain Phasma, as well as further one-shots, continued to expand the Star Wars universe. The comic adaptation of Rogue One: A Star Wars Story was also released. Both the Poe Dameron and the second Darth Vader comics ended their runs in 2018, in September and December respectively.

In 2018, Marvel adapted the events of author Timothy Zahn's Star Wars: Thrawn novel in a limited series. The character had been introduced by Zahn's Heir to the Empire trilogy in the early 1990s, now part of the Legends line, and was re-introduced in the new canon in Star Wars Rebels. Adaptations of both The Last Jedi and Solo: A Star Wars Story were released, and the timeframe of Solo was explored further in the Beckett one-shot and in limited series featuring young Lando (Double or Nothing) and Han's time in the Empire (Imperial Cadet). Marvel announced in October 2018 that a five-issue, Wendig penned miniseries, Star Wars: Shadow of Vader, would be released starting in January 2019. The series would be an anthology told from the perspectives of those who had encountered Darth Vader. After three issues had been written, Wendig was removed from the miniseries (and future projects) by Marvel over concerns of his use of social media, and ultimately the miniseries was cancelled. In December 2018, a new miniseries with a similar premise, Star Wars: Vader – Dark Visions, was announced to be written by Dennis Hopeless with art from Paolo Villanelli and Brian Level and was launched in March 2019.

For 2019, Marvel announced a number of new limited series. As a companion to Star Wars: Alphabet Squadron, a novel by author Alexander Freed centered on a New Republic squadron of various Rebel ships (an A-wing interceptor, B-wing heavy assault fighter, U-wing transport, X-wing starfghter, and Y-wing bomber) in the wake of the Battle of Endor, a five-issue series called Star Wars: TIE Fighter explores the fallout of the battle from both the New Republic and Imperial Remnant sides. A five-issue miniseries titled Star Wars: Galaxy's Edge will feature stories of the Black Spire Outpost on the Outer Rim planet Batuu and tie into the theme park experiences set to open at Disneyland and Walt Disney World in 2019. In May 2019, a one-shot by writer Matthew Rosenberg and various artists called Star Wars #108 Crimson Forever picks up the story of the original Marvel Star Wars comic run that ended in 1986.

In connection with the forthcoming video game Star Wars Jedi: Fallen Order by Electronic Arts and Respawn Entertainment, a five-issue miniseries called Star Wars Jedi: Fallen Order – Dark Temple was announced in June 2019 to start publishing in September. At a panel discussing the Journey to Star Wars: The Rise of Skywalker publishing program at San Diego Comic-Con 2019, the four-issue Star Wars: Journey to The Rise of Skywalker – Allegiance miniseries was announced. It will help cover a one-year period during the time between The Last Jedi and The Rise of Skywalker. Charles Soule was announced to be writing a four-issue miniseries exploring the backstory of Ben Solo's transition into Kylo Ren. Star Wars: The Rise of Kylo Ren premiered on December 16, 2019.

In February of 2021 it was announced that Charles Soule would be writing a miniseries focusing on the events of Boba Fett between The Empire Strikes Back and Return of the Jedi, this series tied in with the rest of the ongoing Marvel series' at the time, would be called War of the Bounty Hunters - and released from May through October of 2021. The story of War of the Bounty Hunters was followed by the additional miniseries Crimson Reign, also penned by Soule, which served as the second in a trilogy of stories revolving around the same cast of characters, notably Qi'ra, whose return to the Star Wars universe occurred in the pages of War of the Bounty Hunters.

Age of Star Wars maxiseries
At San Diego Comic-Con 2018, Marvel announced Age of Star Wars, a 27-issue maxiseries starting in December 2018 that would span all three eras of the Star Wars saga. Star Wars: Age of Republic by writer Jody Houser will focus on the time of the Galactic Republic and the Clone Wars during the prequel trilogy era; Star Wars: Age of Rebellion by writer Greg Pak will focus on the Galactic Civil War between the Empire and the Rebel Alliance during the original trilogy era; and Star Wars: Age of Resistance by writer Tom Taylor will focus on the fall of the New Republic and the struggle between the Resistance and the First Order during the sequel trilogy era. At the time of release, Age of Republic was revealed to have eight one-shots spotlighting individual characters and a special anthology issue with up to four stories by different creative teams.

Age of Star Wars trade paperbacks:

Reprints
In mid-2014, Marvel stated that it would publish collected volumes of past Star Wars comics, beginning with Volume 1 of Star Wars: The Original Marvel Years in January 2015, and Volume 1 of Star Wars Legends Epic Collection: The Empire in April 2015, which reprinted Dark Horse's Star Wars comics. In December 2019, Marvel reprinted the first issue of the 1977 series as Star Wars #1 – Facsimile Edition.

A series of reprints under the title True Believers: Star Wars was released in April and May 2019, celebrating Marvel's 80th anniversary. A second collection of True Believers: Star Wars titles was released in December 2019.

IDW Publishing (2017–2022) 
In September 2017, IDW Publishing debuted Star Wars Adventures, an anthology series published as part of the "Journey to Star Wars: The Last Jedi" publishing program.

In January 2018, IDW released a five-issue comic tie-in to Star Wars: Forces of Destiny.

In November 2018, IDW released Star Wars Adventures: Destroyer Down. This three-issue miniseries reprinted the previously released Loot Crate special from December 2017.

IDW has also published graphic novel adaptations of each Star Wars film since The Force Awakens.

Return to Dark Horse (2022–present) 
On November 18, 2021, it was announced that Dark Horse Comics would once again publish Star Wars comics beginning around the second quarter of 2022. This will include a new line of all-ages comics and graphic novels. In a follow up article. StarWars.com revealed that the first entries to modern Dark Horse storytelling will be Star Wars: Hyperspace Stories (released August, 10, 2022), and Star Wars: Tales From the Rancor Pit, (arriving October 19, 2022) - both series' will follow an all-ages anthology style format. 

Dark Horse's first entry to The High Republic era of the Star Wars timeline was announced at Star Wars Celebration Anaheim 2022. The statement at Star Wars Celebration consisted of an announcement of Dark Horse's creation of a new The High Republic: Adventures series, the first issue of which titled The Nameless Terror. 

The publisher also published a collected edition of Star Wars Rebels comic books from the Star Wars: Rebels Magazine, on August 16th 2022.

See also

 List of Star Wars comic books, an in-universe "chronological" list of comics
 Star Wars (UK comics), a British publication which reprints some of the Dark Horse comics
 Star Wars (manga)

References
Footnotes

Citations

External links

 
 
 
 
 

Comics based on films
 
Comics by Archie Goodwin (comics)
Comics by David Michelinie
Comics by Jason Aaron
Comics by Mark Waid
Comics by Roy Thomas
Dark Horse Comics titles
IDW Publishing titles
Marvel Comics titles
Science fiction comic strips